The Manamadurai–Virudhunagar line is a railway line connecting Virudhunagar and Manamadurai towns in Tamil Nadu.

History 
A new railway line from – was proposed in the Third Five Year plan, which was supposed to ease the pressure on the existing – and – sections. On 1 September 1963, the  – section was opened, along with Aruppukkottai railway station in the same year by the then Chief Minister of Tamil Nadu, K. Kamaraj. And on 2 May 1964, the rest of  – section was thrown to traffic. Opened with meter gauge tracks, the  section had three crossing railway stations viz., Tiruchchuli and Narikkudi catering immensely the passengers of the region and Tuticorin for traffic of goods.

The conversion from metre gauge to broad gauge was effected and the section was closed for operation during 2008. The section which had 22 unmanned level crossings underwent safety inspection on 21 June 2013 for operational fitness. Finally, at a cost of  the broad gauge section consisting of five major bridges, 145 minor bridges and five railway stations (including 3 crossing stations) under Virudhunagar and Sivaganga districts was re-opened for traffic on 14 July 2013 by the Union Minister of state for Civil Aviation, K. C. Venugopal.

Current Situation
After reopening only 2 Express trains Runs on this Route one is Puducherry Kanniyakumari weekly express which ran as the first express train in this route and this line was inaugurated with this train after conversion to Broad gauge. The second train is Silambu Express which is also a Tri weekly express train which runs from Chennai Egmore to Sengottai. Initially this train ran from Karaikudi later extended to Manamadurai. After a prolonged demands from people, this train has been extended till sengottai. Apart from these express trains there is a DEMU passenger train that runs daily between Tiruchirappalli and Virudhunagar.

References

External links
 Southern Railways - Official Website

5 ft 6 in gauge railways in India
Railway lines opened in 1964
Virudhunagar district
Sivaganga district